The 2011 World Fencing Championships was held at Catania, Italy from 8–16 October.

Medal table

Men's events

Women's events

External links
 FIE
 Official website

 
World Fencing Championships
W
Fencing Championships
Sport in Catania
International fencing competitions hosted by Italy
World Fencing Championships